Dalila Argaez Wendlandt (born 1968/1969) is an associate justice of the Massachusetts Supreme Judicial Court. She is a former Associate Justice of the Massachusetts Appeals Court.

Early life and education 

Wendlandt was born in New Orleans, the daughter of Colombian immigrants. She received a Bachelor of Science in Mechanical Engineering from the University of Illinois at Urbana–Champaign in 1991 and a Master of Science in Mechanical Engineering from the Massachusetts Institute of Technology in 1993 and her Juris Doctor with high honors from Stanford Law School in 1996, where she was an editor of the Stanford Law Review.

Legal career 

After graduating law school, she served as a law clerk for Judge John M. Walker Jr. of the United States Court of Appeals for the Second Circuit. In 1997, she joined the law firm Ropes & Gray, eventually becoming a partner.

Judicial career

Massachusetts Court of Appeals 

Wendlandt was appointed to the Massachusetts Appeals Court in 2017 to fill the vacancy left by the elevation of Judge Elspeth B. Cypher to the Supreme Judicial Court. She officially joined the court on July 7, 2017. Her service on the appeals terminated upon being sworn in as an associate justice of the Massachusetts Supreme Judicial Court. She was succeeded by Justice Rachel Hershfang.

Massachusetts Supreme Judicial Court 

On November 20, 2020, Governor Charlie Baker nominated Wendlandt to be an associate justice of the Massachusetts Supreme Judicial Court to the seat vacated by Barbara Lenk who retired on December 1, 2020. On November 25, 2020, she was unanimously confirmed by the Governor's Council. She was sworn into office on December 4, 2020. She is the first Latina to serve on the Massachusetts Supreme Judicial Court.

References

External links 

Official Biography at Mass.gov

|-

1960s births
Living people
20th-century American lawyers
21st-century American judges
21st-century American lawyers
21st-century American women judges
American people of Colombian descent
20th-century American women lawyers
Hispanic and Latino American judges
Judges of the Massachusetts Appeals Court
Justices of the Massachusetts Supreme Judicial Court
MIT School of Engineering alumni
Massachusetts lawyers
People from New Orleans
Stanford Law School alumni
Grainger College of Engineering alumni